Senthamarai was an Indian actor who acted in Tamil cinema and theatre.

Career 
Senthamarai was born on 13 April 1935 at Kancheepuram. His family included his father Thiruvenkadam, his mother Vedammal, and brother Kamalakannan. Thiruvenkadam died when Senthamarai was seven years old. Senthamarai acted many stage plays along with Sivaji Ganesan and M. G. Ramachandran before entering film. In 1980's, he acted mainly in villainous roles, but also did character roles opposite many leading actors of those times.

Family 
Senthamarai was married to Kousalya who currently acts in Tamil serials.

Death 
Senthamarai died on 14 August 1992 of a heart attack.

Filmography

1950s

1960s

1970s

1980s

1990s

References

External links 
 

1935 births
1992 deaths
20th-century Indian male actors
Actors in Tamil theatre
Indian male film actors
Indian male voice actors
Male actors in Tamil cinema
People from Kanchipuram district
Tamil actors